Prosopochrysa is a genus of flies in the family Stratiomyidae.

Species
Prosopochrysa azurea (Lindner, 1951)
Prosopochrysa chusanensis Ôuchi, 1938
Prosopochrysa lemannae Woodley & Lessard, 2019
Prosopochrysa sinensis Lindner, 1940
Prosopochrysa vitripennis (Doleschall, 1856)

References

Stratiomyidae
Brachycera genera
Taxa named by Johannes C. H. de Meijere
Diptera of Asia
Diptera of Australasia